Rodrigo Braña (born 7 March 1979) is a former Argentine football midfielder. His last team was Estudiantes (LP) of the Argentine Primera División.

Career

Braña started his career playing for Quilmes in the Primera B Nacional (Argentine second division). He has had three different spells with the club, which alternated between the second and the top division.

Braña had a short spell with RCD Mallorca in Spain where he played for their B team between 1998 and 1999. Braña also had a short spell with Argentine club Unión de Santa Fe in 2001.

In 2005, Braña joined Estudiantes, where he has become an idol for the La Plata club.  The two biggest highlights of his career to date have been winning the Apertura 2006 and the Copa Libertadores 2009 with Estudiantes.

Braña was a key figure on the Estudiantes team that won its first Argentine League title in 23 years after a 2-1 playoff victory against Boca Juniors to decide the winner of the Apertura 2006 champions.  "El Chapu" won many accolades for his contribution to the championship winning team; he was selected as the third best player of the Apertura 2006 tournament by Argentine sports newspaper Olé. The only players that finished above him in the list were teammates Mariano Pavone and Juan Sebastián Verón. He has formed a formidable partnership in the center of midfield with Veron in recent seasons.

In 2008, he formed part of the team that finished as runners-up in Copa Sudamericana 2008.

Braña was then a regular player in the team that won Copa Libertadores 2009.  His typical speed, stamina, and defensive skills in the midfield were key factors in Estudiantes' lifting the continental championship for the first time in 39 years.

After the Libertadores victory, he faced a serious offer from Mexican club Monterrey to take him to play in Mexico.  Braña eventually decided to stay with Estudiantes, a decision that was rewarded with his first-ever call up to the Argentina national team on 1 September 2009.

Braña retired at the end of the 2018-19 season.

International appearances and goals

Honors
Estudiantes
Argentine Primera División (2): 2006 Apertura, 2010 Apertura
Copa Libertadores (1): 2009

References

External links

 Argentine Primera statistics  
 

1979 births
Living people
Argentine footballers
Association football midfielders
Quilmes Atlético Club footballers
Unión de Santa Fe footballers
RCD Mallorca B players
Estudiantes de La Plata footballers
Argentine Primera División players
Primera Nacional players
People from Berazategui Partido
Argentina international footballers
Argentine expatriate footballers
Argentine expatriate sportspeople in Spain
Expatriate footballers in Spain
Sportspeople from Buenos Aires Province